The Rhenish Massif, Rhine Massif or Rhenish Uplands (: 'Rhenish Slate Uplands') is a geologic massif in western Germany, eastern Belgium, Luxembourg and northeastern France.  It is drained centrally, south to north by the river Rhine and a few of its tributaries.

West of the indent of the Cologne Bight it has the Eifel and the Belgian and French Ardennes; east is its greatest German component, the Süder Uplands. The Hunsrück hills form its southwest. The Westerwald is an eastern strip. The Lahn-Dill area is a small central zone and the Taunus Mountains form the rest, the south-east.

The massif hosts the Middle Rhine Valley (Rhine Gorge), a UNESCO World Heritage site linked to the lowest parts of the Moselle.

Geology

Geologically the Rhenish Massif consists of metamorphic rocks, mostly slates (hence its German name), deformed and metamorphosed during the Hercynian orogeny (around 300 million years ago). Most of the massif is part of the Rhenohercynian zone of this orogeny, that also encompasses the Harz further east and Devonian rocks of Cornwall (southwestern England).

Most rocks in the Rhenish Massif were originally sediments, mostly deposited during the Devonian and Carboniferous in a back-arc basin called the Rhenohercynian basin. In some places in the Ardennes, even older rocks of Cambrian to Silurian age crop out as massifs overlain by Devonian slates. These older rocks form smaller massifs of their own (Stavelot, Rocroi, Givonne and Serpont). In the eastern Rhenish Massif some very limited outcrops in the Sauerland show rocks of Ordovician and lower Siliurian age. Further Ordovician rock exposures are part of the southern Taunus.

The second rock type are Tertiary and Quaternary igneous rocks, which most prominently occur in the Vulkaneifel, the Westerwald and the Vogelsberg. The volcanic rocks have been linked to a mantle plume that, due to its low density and buoyancy, uplifted the entire region during the last few hundred thousand years, as measured from the present elevation of old river terraces.

Mountain and hill ranges 
The mountain and hill ranges within the Rhenish Massif - some with maximum height in metres above sea level (NN)) are given below:

References

Literature 
 d´Hein: Nationaler Geopark Vulkanland Eifel. Ein Natur- und Kulturführer. Gaasterland Verlag Düsseldorf 2006, .
 Fliegel, D.: Ein geologisches Profil durch das Rheinische Schiefergebirge. Cöln, 1909. Online-Ausgabe dilibri Rheinland-Pfalz.
 von Winterfeld, Claus; Bayer, Ulf; Oncken, Onno; Lünenschloß, Brita; Springer, Jörn (1994): Das westliche Rheinische Schiefergebirge. Geowissenschaften; 12; 320-324, .
 Meyer, W.: Geologie der Eifel, Schweizerbart'sche Verlagsbuchhandlung, Stuttgart, 1986. .
 Schmidt, E. et al.: Deutschland. Harms Handbuch der Geographie. Paul List Verlag KG, 26th edn., Munich, 1975. .
 Thews, J.-D.: Erläuterungen zur Geologischen Übersichtskarte von Hessen 1:300.000, Geol. Abhandlungen Hessen Bd. 96, Hess. L.-A. für Bodenforschung, Wiesbaden, 1996. .
 Vogel, Andreas, Hubert Miller and Reinhard Greiling, The Rhenish Massif: Structure, Evolution, Mineral Deposits and Present Geodynamics. Wiesbaden: Springer, 1987. .
 Walter, R. et al.: Geologie von Mitteleuropa. 5th edition, Schweizerbarth’sche Verlagsbuchhandlung, Stuttgart, 1992.  (German).

 
Geology of Germany
Geography of North Rhine-Westphalia
Geography of Rhineland-Palatinate
Geography of Hesse
Rhineland
Geology of Belgium
Geology of Luxembourg
Geology of France